The 2013 Irwin Tools Night Race was a NASCAR Sprint Cup Series stock car race that was held on August 24, 2013, at Bristol Motor Speedway in Bristol, Tennessee. Contested over 500 laps, it was the twenty-fourth race of the 2013 NASCAR Sprint Cup Series season. Matt Kenseth of Joe Gibbs Racing won the race, his fifth victory of the season, while Kasey Kahne finished second. Juan Pablo Montoya, Brian Vickers, and Joey Logano rounded out the top five.

Report
Denny Hamlin took the pole and led the first 22 laps. After being passed by Kurt Busch, Hamlin would fall back to mid-field. Busch would lead most of the laps until lap 81, when he came down pit road for a loose wheel and was given a pass-through for speeding. Carl Edwards and Dale Earnhardt Jr. shared the lead during the next two stints, before Clint Bowyer passed Earnhardt for the lead on lap 126. Bowyer led until getting spun on lap 176, causing the fourth caution. Edwards retook the lead, showing the way until being passed by Matt Kenseth on lap 236. After a lap 259 debris caution, Kenseth was caught speeding on pit road and relegated to the back, while Paul Menard stayed out to take the lead. Edwards once again claimed the lead on lap 322.

Kevin Harvick took the lead after the seventh caution on lap 335, but he was quickly passed by Edwards on lap 344. Edwards held the lead through two more cautions, but dropped a cylinder on lap 380 and blew his engine on lap 389. Kenseth held the lead through most of the final 120 laps and held off a final 10-lap charge by Kasey Kahne to score his fifth victory of the season. Juan Pablo Montoya finished third, and Brian Vickers and Joey Logano rounded out the top five. Eleven caution flags waved during the race, three of which were for debris. Drivers involved in seven, mostly minor, crashes included Ryan Truex, Josh Wise, Clint Bowyer, Tony Raines, Jimmie Johnson, David Reutimann, Aric Almirola, and Jeff Burton. The eleventh caution on lap 448, as Hamlin blew a tire and ran into Ryan Newman, causing a large crash also involving Brad Keselowski, Martin Truex Jr., Terry Labonte, David Stremme, Casey Mears, David Ragan and Kevin Harvick. After the crash, Harvick stopped for a few moments in Hamlin's pitbox preventing the #11 to access his box. Truex Jr. suffered a broken wrist after the accident.

Qualifying

Race results

Lap leaders

Notes

  Points include 3 Chase for the Sprint Cup points for winning, 1 point for leading a lap, and 1 point for most laps led.
  Ineligible for driver's championship points.

Standings after the race

Drivers' Championship standings

Manufacturers' Championship standings

Note: Only the first twelve positions are included for the driver standings.

References

Irwin Tools Night Race
Irwin Tools Night Race
Irwin Tools Night Race
NASCAR races at Bristol Motor Speedway